Battalion Zośka (pronounced /'zɔɕ.ka/; 'Sophie' in Polish) was a Scouting battalion of the Polish resistance movement organisation - Home Army (Armia Krajowa or "AK") during World War II. It mainly consisted of members of the Szare Szeregi paramilitary Boy Scouts. It was formed in late August 1943. A part of the Radosław Group, the battalion played a major role in the Warsaw Uprising of 1944.

Zośka was named after Tadeusz Zawadzki, who used the name as his pseudonym during the AK's early days. He was killed during a partisan action.

History
The battalion was formed in late August 1943 as part of the Radosław Group, fighting in Wola and the Starówka, from where they allowed the "Rudy" company to do a breakthrough to the centre of the city through the Saxon Garden which eventually failed. After capturing two Panther tanks in 2nd August, an armoured platoon was formed under the command of Wacław Micuta. The battalion gained the War Order of Virtuti Militari.

Liberation of the concentration camp "Gęsiówka"
Zośka fighters liberated prisoners of the concentration camp Gęsiówka in August 1944. The 383 able-bodied prisoners (including 348 Jews), both men and women who were left in Gęsiówka to assist with the destruction of the evidence of mass murder, were rescued from certain death. Most of these survivors joined the Zośka unit and fought in the Warsaw uprising.

Other famous Home Army battalions were: Miotła, Czata, Pięść, and Batalion Parasol. Between 1944 and 1956, all of the former members of Batalion Zośka were incarcerated in the Soviet NKVD prisons.

Commanding officers during the Warsaw Uprising

Notable Battalion fighters

 Krzysztof Kamil Baczyński
 Roger Barlet
 Ryszard Białous
 Andrzej Cielecki
 Lidia Daniszewska
 Aleksy Dawidowski
 Juliusz Bogdan Deczkowski
 Jerzy Gawin
 Jerzy Jagiełło (porucznik)
 Jacek Karpiński
 Tadeusz Kosudarski
 Jan Kopałka
 Andrzej Łukoski
 Henryk Kozłowski
 Zygmunt Kujawski
 Wacław Micuta
 Tadeusz Maślonkowski
 Wiktor Matulewicz
 Krystyna Niżyńska
 Konrad Okolski
 Jerzy Ossowski
 Jerzy Pepłowski
 Jan Rodowicz
 Eugeniusz Romański
 Andrzej Romocki
 Jan Romocki
 Jan Rossman
 Eugeniusz Stasiecki
 Tadeusz Sumiński
 Anna Wajcowicz
 Kazimierz Wasiłowski
 Jerzy Weil
 Jan Wuttke
 Anna Zakrzewska
 Jan J. Więckowski

References

Bibliography

 "Pamiętniki żołnierzy baonu Zośka", Nasza Księgarnia, Warsaw 1986 . 
 Agnieszka Pietrzak: Żołnierze Batalionu Armii Krajowej "Zośka" represjonowani w latach 1944–1956. Warsaw: Instytut Pamięci Narodowej, 2008. . 
 Aleksander Kamiński: Zośka i Parasol : opowieść o niektórych ludziach i niektórych akcjach dwóch batalionów harcerskich. Warsaw: Iskry, 2009. . 

Battalions of Poland
Military units and formations established in 1944
Units and formations of the Home Army
Warsaw Uprising
Guerrilla organizations
Zoska
Military units and formations disestablished in 1944
Paramilitary organisations based in Poland